Thomas Wesley-Smith (6 April 1896 — 21 July 1984) was an Anglo-Argentine first-class cricketer.

The son of Henry Smith, he was born in Argentina in April 1896 and was educated in England at Charterhouse School. He returned to Argentina after completing his education and later made a single appearance in first-class cricket for Argentina against the Marylebone Cricket Club at Buenos Aires in January 1927. Batting twice in the match, he was dismissed in the Argentine first innings for a single run by Tom Jameson, while in their second innings he was dismissed for 13 runs by the same bowler. In club cricket, he was a member of the Hurlingham Club. Wesley-Smith died at Córdoba in July 1984.

References

External links

1896 births
1984 deaths
Argentine people of English descent
People educated at Charterhouse School
Argentine cricketers